Joseph Noble may refer to:

 Joseph V. Noble (1920–2007), American museum administrator and antiquities collector
 Joseph William Noble (1799–1861), British politician
 Joseph D. Noble, United States Navy admiral